Armenia participated in the 2019 European Games held in Minsk from 21 to 30 June 2019. The number of Armenian athletes participating in the 2019 European Games was 37 and the types of sports they represent are nine.

Medalist

Badminton

Boxing

Men

Women

Canoe sprint

Men

Cycling

Track

Gymnastics

Artistic
Men

Judo

Men

Sambo

Key:
 ML – Minimal advantage by last technical evaluation
 MT – Minimal advantage by technical points
 VH – Total victory – painful hold
 VO – Victory by technical points – the loser without technical points
 VP – Victory by technical points – the loser with technical points
 VS – Total victory by decisive superiority
 VT – Total victory – total throw

Men

Women

Shooting

Men

Women

Mixed

Wrestling

Key:
 VFA – Victory by fall
 VFO – Victory by forfeit
 VIN – Victory by injury
 VPO – Victory by points – the loser without technical points
 VPO1 – Victory by points – the loser with technical points
 VSU – Victory by technical superiority – the loser without technical points and a margin of victory of at least 8 (Greco-Roman) or 10 (freestyle) points
 VSU1 – Victory by technical superiority – the loser with technical points and a margin of victory of at least 8 (Greco-Roman) or 10 (freestyle) points

Men's freestyle

Men's Greco-Roman

See also
	
 Armenia at the Olympics	
 List of multi-sport events
 Sport in Armenia

References

Nations at the 2019 European Games
European Games
2019